Nagarik App (translation: Citizen App); is a mobile application launched by the Government of Nepal to provide government-related services in a single online platform. The services provided through the application include PAN registration, getting local government information, viewing details of the taxes submitted, services related to Citizen Investment Trust, Police clearance report, Malpot (Land ownership info), Health insurance board, educational details and Opening bank account online. The services are added gradually.

The full version of the app designed to provide all government services as much as possible from a single app has been launched by Prime Minister KP Sharma Oli on the occasion of fourth national Information and Communication Technology Day 2021(2078 BS).

Services 
PAN Registration
Online Police Clearance Report
Vehicle Tax Payment
Health Insurance Board Renew
COVID Vaccine QR Certificate
Nepal Passport, Driving License, Citizenship and Voter ID
No Object Certificate
PF/PAN/SST/CIT statements
KUKL Bill Inquiry
Nagarik Pahichan Dwar (Online bank account opening, KYC Verification)

Awards and Honors 
Nagarikapp is winner of World Summit Award 2022 in Government and Citizen Engagement Section.

References

External links 

 Official website

Mobile applications
Government of Nepal
Science and technology in Nepal
2019 establishments in Nepal